John I. Slingerland (March 1, 1804 – October 26, 1861) was a New York farmer, businessman, and politician.  He served terms in both the New York State Assembly and the United States House of Representatives.

A native and lifelong resident of Bethlehem, New York, Slingerland was educated in the schools of Bethlehem and became a successful farmer.  He was also involved in several businesses, including the creation of a toll road that linked the hamlet of Slingerlands to Albany.  Originally a Whig, and later a Republican, while serving in the Assembly in the 1840s Slingerland was active on the side of the tenants during the Anti-Rent War, when the renters of the Albany area's small farms rose up against the effort of the Patroons to collect long-overdue back rents.  Their efforts led to the end of the manor system that had empowered and enriched a few large landowning families since the founding of New York in the early 1600s.

Slingerland was also an antislavery activist; his work to publicize the 1848 Pearl incident while serving in Congress generated national headlines that caused advocates of abolition to increase their efforts to end slave trading in Washington, DC.  Slingerland became a Republican when the party was founded in 1855, and campaigned for John C. Frémont for president in 1856.  He served in the Assembly again from 1860 to 1861 and continued to advocate for tenants who wanted to end the manor system.

Slingerland died at his home in Slingerands, which is within the Slingerlands Historic District, and was interred in the family vault on his property.

Early life
Slingerland was born in Jerusalem (now Feura Bush), a hamlet of Bethlehem, New York, and was the son of John and Leah (Britt) Slingerland.  He attended the local schools, operated a successful farm, and took part in several business ventures.  Among the companies in which he was a participant was the Albany, Rensselaerville and Schoharie Plank Road Company; he was an original incorporator, and served on the board of directors.  During its existence, the company built and maintained a toll road from Albany to Gallupville, which passed through New Scotland, New Salem, and Berne.

New York State Assembly
A Whig, Slingerland was a member of the New York State Assembly in 1843 and 1844.  During the Anti-Rent War, a revolt by tenants against New York's Patroon system, Slingerland sided with the tenants, a position he maintained during his service in the Assembly and his term in Congress.

Congressman
He was elected as a Whig to the 30th Congress, holding office from March 4, 1847 to March 3, 1849.  He was not a candidate for renomination in 1848 and resumed his business and agricultural pursuits.  He was active in railroad development, and worked to bring the Albany and Susquehanna Railroad line to Bethlehem.

In 1848 Slingerland made national headlines when he alerted anti-slavery activists to the plight of more than 70 slaves who had attempted to escape Washington aboard a ship, The Pearl. Slave owners and slave traders recaptured the escapees and sold many of them to owners in the deep South, making it more difficult for them to escape again.  The publicity Slingerland helped generate had the effect of causing abolitionists to increase their efforts to end the slave trade in Washington.

Later life
He joined the Republican Party at its founding, and campaigned for John C. Frémont for President in 1856.  He served again in the New York State Assembly from 1860 to 1861.

Death and burial

Slingerland died in Slingerlands, New York on October 26, 1861; interment was in the Slingerland family mausoleum.

Family
In 1823, Slingerland married Elizabeth Van Derzee (1802-1835) in New Salem.  Their children included Maria, John (d. 1882), and Harmon V. (1835-1917).

After the death of his first wife, Slingerland married Sally Hall (d. 1874).  Their children included Elizabeth (b. 1838) and William (b. 1845).

Legacy
The hamlet of Slingerlands is named for his family, and some descendants continue to reside there.  His home at 1575 New Scotland Road still stands and is part of the Slingerlands Historic District, which was added to the National Register of Historic Places in 2012.  In 2018, an article in the Albany Times Union detailed ongoing efforts to preserve the Slingerland family vault.

References

Sources

Newspapers

Books

Internet

Magazines

Notes

Further reading

External links

John I. Slingerland at The Political Graveyard

1804 births
1861 deaths
Members of the New York State Assembly
New York (state) Republicans
Whig Party members of the United States House of Representatives from New York (state)
Burials in New York (state)
People from Bethlehem, New York
19th-century American politicians